Tim Curran (born 9 May 1984) is an Australian rugby union footballer for the Secom Rugguts in Japan. He previously played for London Irish and Super Rugby team, the Brumbies.

Although born in Canada, Curran was raised in Canberra, ACT.

External links
London Irish Bio
Guinness Premiership

1984 births
Australian rugby union players
Canadian expatriate sportspeople in Australia
Canadian rugby union players
London Irish players
Sportspeople from Canberra
Sportspeople from Vancouver
Living people
Rugby union centres
Rugby union fullbacks